Circobotys is a genus of moths of the family Crambidae.

Species
Circobotys arrogantalis (Tams in Caradja, 1927)
Circobotys aurealis (Leech, 1889)
Circobotys brevivittalis (Hampson, 1996)
Circobotys cryptica Munroe & Mutuura, 1969
Circobotys elegans Munroe & Mutuura, 1969
Circobotys elongata Munroe & Mutuura, 1969
Circobotys flaviciliata (Hampson, 1910)
Circobotys heterogenalis (Bremer, 1864)
Circobotys limbata Moore, 1888
Circobotys malaisei Munroe & Mutuura, 1970
Circobotys nigrescens (Moore, 1888)
Circobotys nycterina Butler, 1879
Circobotys occultilinea (Walker, 1863)
Circobotys plebeia Munroe & Mutuura, 1969
Circobotys sinisalis (Walker, 1859)

References

Pyraustinae
Crambidae genera